Sumatra is one of the richest islands in Indonesia for animals. Its bird total species is second only to New Guinea. This great wealth is due to the large size of Sumatra, its diversity of habitat and also its past link with the Asian mainland. This following list of birds is based on the taxonomic treatment and scientific nomenclature of The Clements Checklist of Birds of the World, 6th edition.

Ducks, geese and swans
Order: AnseriformesFamily: Anatidae

Pheasants, grouse, and allies
Order: GalliformesFamily: Phasianidae

Shearwaters and petrels
Order: ProcellariiformesFamily: Procellariidae

Austral storm petrels
Order: ProcellariiformesFamily: Oceanitidae

Northern storm petrels
Order: ProcellariiformesFamily: Hydrobatidae

Tropicbirds
Order: PhaethontiformesFamily: Phaethontidae

Storks
Order: CiconiiformesFamily: Ciconiidae

Frigatebirds
Order: SuliformesFamily: Fregatidae

Boobies and gannets
Order: SuliformesFamily: Sulidae

Cormorants
Order: SuliformesFamily: Phalacrocoracidae

Darters
Order: SuliformesFamily: Anhingidae

Pelicans
Order: PelecaniformesFamily: Pelecanidae

Herons, egrets, and bitterns
Order: PelecaniformesFamily: Ardeidae

Ibises and spoonbills
Order: PelecaniformesFamily: Threskiornithidae

Osprey
Order: AccipitriformesFamily: Pandionidae

Hawks, eagles, and kites
Order: AccipitriformesFamily: Accipitridae

Caracaras and falcons
Order: FalconiformesFamily: Falconidae

Rails, gallinules, and coots
Order: GruiformesFamily: Rallidae

Sungrebe and finfoots
Order: GruiformesFamily: Heliornithidae

Thick-knees
Order: CharadriiformesFamily: Burhinidae

Avocets and stilts
Order: CharadriiformesFamily: Recurvirostridae

Plovers and lapwings
Order: CharadriiformesFamily: Charadriidae

Painted-snipe
Order: CharadriiformesFamily: Rostratulidae

Jacanas
Order: CharadriiformesFamily: Jacanidae

Sandpipers and allies
Order: CharadriiformesFamily: Scolopacidae

Buttonquails
Order: CharadriiformesFamily: Turnicidae

Pratincoles and coursers
Order: CharadriiformesFamily: Glareolidae

Skuas and jaegers
Order: CharadriiformesFamily: Stercorariidae

Gulls, terns, and skimmers
Order: CharadriiformesFamily: Laridae

Pigeons and doves
Order: ColumbiformesFamily: Columbidae

Hornbills
Order: BucerotiformesFamily: Bucerotidae

Cuckoos and anis
Order: CuculiformesFamily: Cuculidae

Barn owls
Order: StrigiformesFamily: Tytonidae

Typical owls
Order: StrigiformesFamily: Strigidae

Frogmouths
Order: CaprimulgiformesFamily: Podargidae

Nightjars
Order: CaprimulgiformesFamily: Caprimulgidae

Swifts
Order: CaprimulgiformesFamily: Apodidae

Treeswifts
Order: CaprimulgiformesFamily: Hemiprocnidae

Trogons and quetzals
Order: TrogoniformesFamily: Trogonidae

Kingfishers
Order: CoraciiformesFamily: Alcedinidae

Bee-eaters
Order: CoraciiformesFamily: Meropidae

Typical rollers
Order: CoraciiformesFamily: Coraciidae

Asian barbets
Order: PiciformesFamily: Megalaimidae

Honeyguides
Order: PiciformesFamily: Indicatoridae

Woodpeckers and allies
Order: PiciformesFamily: Picidae

Old world parrots
Order: PsittaciformesFamily: Psittaculidae

Asian and Grauer’s broadbills
Order: PasseriformesFamily: Eurylaimidae

African and green broadbills
Order: PasseriformesFamily: Calyptomenidae

Pittas
Order: PasseriformesFamily: Pittidae

Thornbills and allies
Order: PasseriformesFamily: Acanthizidae

Woodshrikes
Order: PasseriformesFamily: Vangidae

Woodswallows
Order: PasseriformesFamily: Artamidae

Ioras
Order: PasseriformesFamily: Aegithinidae

Cuckooshrikes
Order: PasseriformesFamily: Campephagidae

Whistlers and allies
Order: PasseriformesFamily: Pachycephalidae

Crested shrikejay
Order: PasseriformesFamily: Platylophidae

Shrikes
Order: PasseriformesFamily: Laniidae

Vireos
Order: PasseriformesFamily: Vireonidae

Old World orioles
Order: PasseriformesFamily: Oriolidae

Drongos
Order: PasseriformesFamily: Dicruridae

Fantails
Order: PasseriformesFamily: Rhipiduridae

Monarch flycatchers
Order: PasseriformesFamily: Monarchidae

Crows, jays, ravens and magpies
Order: PasseriformesFamily: Corvidae

Rail-babbler
Order: PasseriformesFamily: Eupetidae

Swallows
Order: PasseriformesFamily: Hirundinidae

Fairy flycatchers
Order: PasseriformesFamily: Stenostiridae

Chickadees and titmice
Order: PasseriformesFamily: Paridae

Nuthatches
Order: PasseriformesFamily: Sittidae

Bulbuls
Order: PasseriformesFamily: Pycnonotidae

Cupwings
Order: PasseriformesFamily: Pnoepygidae

Bush warblers and allies
Order: PasseriformesFamily: Scotocercidae

Phylloscopid warblers
Order: PasseriformesFamily: Phylloscopidae

Acrocephalid warblers
Order: PasseriformesFamily: Acrocephalidae
Order: PasseriformesFamily: Phylloscopidae

Locustellid warblers
Order: PasseriformesFamily: Locustellidae

Cisticolas and allies
Order: PasseriformesFamily: Cisticolidae

White-eyes
Order: PasseriformesFamily: Zosteropidae

Tree-babblers, scimitar-babblers, and allies
Order: PasseriformesFamily: Timaliidae

Ground babblers
Order: PasseriformesFamily: Pellorneidae

Laughingthrushes
Order: PasseriformesFamily: Leiothrichidae

Fairy-bluebirds
Order: PasseriformesFamily: Irenidae

Old World flycatchers
Order: PasseriformesFamily: Muscicapidae

Thrushes and allies
Order: PasseriformesFamily: Turdidae

Starlings
Order: PasseriformesFamily: Sturnidae

Leafbirds
Order: PasseriformesFamily: Chloropseidae

Flowerpeckers
Order: PasseriformesFamily: Dicaeidae

Sunbirds and spiderhunters
Order: PasseriformesFamily: Nectariniidae

Wagtails and pipits
Order: PasseriformesFamily: Motacillidae

Finches, euphonias, and allies
Order: PasseriformesFamily: Fringillidae

Old World sparrows
Order: PasseriformesFamily: Passeridae

Weavers and allies
Order: PasseriformesFamily: Ploceidae

Waxbills and allies
Order: PasseriformesFamily: Estrildidae

See also
Fauna of Indonesia

Notes

References

'birds
'
Sumatra